The 2019–20 Evansville Purple Aces men's basketball team represented the University of Evansville during the 2019–20 NCAA Division I men's basketball season. The Purple Aces played their home games at the Ford Center as members of the Missouri Valley Conference (MVC). They finished the season 9–23, 0–18 in MVC play to finish in last place. They lost in the first round of the MVC tournament to Valparaiso. 

They were coached by Walter McCarty until he was placed on administrative leave on December 27 for alleged Title IX violations and ultimately fired on January 21. Assistant coach Bennie Seltzer acted as interim coach until Todd Lickliter was hired as the new head coach.

Previous season
The Purple Aces finished the 2018–19 season 11–21, 5–13 in MVC play to finish in last place. As the No. 10 seed in the MVC tournament, they lost to Illinois State in the first round.

Offseason

Departures

Incoming transfers

2019 recruiting class

Preseason 
Evansville was picked to finish eighth in the MVC in the preseason despite returning leading scorer K.K. Riley and incorporating three transfers who sat out the previous season.

Season notes

Win over No. 1 Kentucky 
On November 12, Evansville scored its first win over a No. 1-ranked team in program history when it upset Kentucky 67–64. Junior guard Sam Cunliffe hit a pair of free throws with 6.8 seconds to go to help secure the victory for the Purple Aces and finished with 17 points.

Coaching changes 
The season saw Evansville go through several coaching changes. First, second-year head coach Walter McCarty was placed on administrative leave by the school on December 27, 2019 pending a Title IX investigation against him. Assistant coach Bennie Seltzer served as interim head coach of the Purple Aces during McCarty's initial absence. On January 21, 2020, Evansville fired McCarty following additional allegations of misconduct, and named former Butler and Iowa head coach Todd Lickliter (who had served as assistant coach under McCarty a season prior, before resigning due to health problems) as the new head coach.

Roster

Schedule and results

|-
!colspan=9 style=| Exhibition

|-
!colspan=9 style=| Non-conference regular season

|-
!colspan=9 style=| Missouri Valley Conference regular season

|-
!colspan=12 style=| MVC tournament
|-

References

Evansville Purple Aces men's basketball seasons
Evansville
Evansville
Evansville